The 1973 San Diego State Aztecs football team represented California State University San Diego during the 1973 NCAA Division I football season as a member of the Pacific Coast Athletic Association.

The team was led by head coach Claude Gilbert, in his first year, and played home games at San Diego Stadium in San Diego, California. They finished the season as Conference Champion for the second consecutive year, with a record of nine wins, one loss and one tie (9–1–1, 3–0–1 PCAA).

Schedule

Team players in the NFL
The following were selected in the 1974 NFL Draft.

The following finished their college career in 1973, were not drafted, but played in the NFL.

Team awards

Notes

References

San Diego State
San Diego State Aztecs football seasons
Big West Conference football champion seasons
San Diego State Aztecs football